Eucorydia miyakoensis is a species of cockroach first discovered on Miyako Island, in Japan's Ryukyu Archipelago, in 2021. It is found exclusively in the forests of Miyako Island, where it lives in the forest floor's leaf litter and humus.

Appearance 
Eucorydia miyakoensis males grow between 12.5 and 13 mm in length. It has a distinct orange band on its upper wings. The antennae are shiny and black, and divided into 36–38 segments.

References 

Corydiidae
Endangered insects
Fauna of Japan
Endemic fauna of the Ryukyu Islands
Insects described in 2021